"Think" is a Mick Jagger and Keith Richards composition that first appeared as a Chris Farlowe single which reached No 37 on the UK Singles Chart in January 1966.  

The Rolling Stones' own version appeared three months later on their Aftermath album, with a rewritten third verse.

Personnel

According to authors Philippe Margotin and Jean-Michel Guesdon, except where noted:

Mick Jagger vocals
Keith Richards fuzz guitar, acoustic guitar,  backing vocals
Brian Jones rhythm guitar
Bill Wyman bass
Charlie Watts drums

References

Sources

 
 

The Rolling Stones songs
1965 songs
1966 singles
Immediate Records singles
Songs written by Jagger–Richards
Song recordings produced by Andrew Loog Oldham
Song recordings produced by Mick Jagger
Song recordings produced by Keith Richards

Chris Farlowe songs